"Both Parties Concerned" is a short story by J. D. Salinger, first published in the Saturday Evening Post on February 26, 1944.  The story chronicles a young couple's struggles to mature from adolescence and the conflicts they encounter raising a baby.

References

1944 short stories
Short stories by J. D. Salinger
Works originally published in The Saturday Evening Post